The Commissioner for Health and Food Safety is the member of the European Commission. The current post of Commissioner is held by Stella Kyriakidou from Cyprus, a psychologist and politician of the conservative Democratic Rally party.   The portfolio is responsible for matters of public health, food safety, animal health and plant health.

Portfolio
Markos Kyprianou was appointed to the Barroso Commission as European Commissioner for Health & Consumer Protection; however, with the accession of Bulgaria on 1 January 2007, the Consumer Protect portfolio was split off and given to Meglena Kuneva (See: European Commissioner for Consumer Protection). The post's Directorate-General is still merged with that office.

One policy is the promotion of warnings on tobacco packets, with the Commission moving towards pictorial warnings. Following several European Union member states enacting bans on smoking in public places Kyprianou proposed a plan for an EU-wide ban of that kind.

In May 2007, Kyprianou released a paper to tackle the shortage of organ donation in the Union. The plan included promotion, specially trained medical staff and an EU wide organ donor card. After Kyprianou was appointed Foreign Minister of Cyprus, he was replaced by Androulla Vasiliou on 3 March 2008.

List of commissioners

See also
 Directorate-General for Health and Food Safety
 European Agency for Safety and Health at Work

References

External links
 Commissioner's website
 Commission's health website
 EU Health portal

European Union consumer protection policy
European Union health policy
Food safety in the European Union
Health and Consumer Policy